Verch is a surname. Notable people with the surname include:

April Verch, Canadian fiddler, singer, and step dancer
Ronald Verch (born 1986), German sprint canoer

See also
Lerch